Erlenbach railway station may refer to

 Erlenbach ZH railway station, in the Swiss canton of Zurich
 Erlenbach im Simmental railway station, in the Swiss canton of Bern